Norman Gray (September 20, 1875 – July 13, 1952) was a merchant and politician in Newfoundland. He represented Twillingate in the Newfoundland House of Assembly from 1932 to 1934 as a United Newfoundland Party member.

He was born in Twillingate and began work there, later moving to St. John's, where he found work in a department store. He moved to Botwood to open a branch there. He opened his own business in Angle Brook. After leaving politics in 1934, he operated Gray Stores Ltd. Gray died in Twillingate at the age of 76.

References 

1875 births
1952 deaths
United Newfoundland Party MHAs
People from Botwood